General Bank of Greece ( - General Bank of Greece) was a Greek financier group that provided complete banking and financing services. It was founded in 1937.

The bank has been traded at the Athens Stock Exchange since 26 January 1963.  The main shareholder of General Bank of Greece was the Participial Fund of Army. In March 2004 the majority of shares was acquired by Société Générale Group and the name was changed from General Bank of Greece to Geniki Bank. In December 2012 all of Société Générale's shares were sold to Piraeus Bank.

See also

List of banks in Greece

References

Defunct banks of Greece
1937 establishments in Greece
Société Générale
Former Greek subsidiaries of foreign companies
Greek companies established in 1937
Banks established in 1937
Companies based in Athens